The A 11 autoroute is a motorway which connects Paris with Nantes via Le Mans and Angers. It is called  L'Océane.

Regions crossed 
The following list indexes the sites worth visiting within 14 km of the road. 
 Paris
 Chartres
 Le Mans
 Angers
 Nantes

History 
 1972: Opening of the first section, La Folie Bessin - Thivars, is 68 km (A 10 and A 11).
 1975: Opening of the section Chartres to La Ferté-Bernard.
 1978: Opening of the section La Ferté-Bernard to  Le Mans.
 1981: Opening of the section Angers-Nantes.
 2008: Opening of the Angers bypass

Route

Managed by Cofiroute
  A10-A11
 01 (Ablis) to 4 km: served cities Ablis and Rambouillet
 Rest Areas: Gourville (westbound), Chaudonnes (eastbound)
 Service Area: Chartres
 02 (Chartres-East) to 27 km: served city Chartres
 Rest Areas: Les Souchets (westbound), Les Moineaux (eastbound)
 03 (Chartres-Center) to 40 km: served cities Chartres and Châteaudun
 Rest Areas: La Poële Percée (westbound), Les Dix-Sept-Setiers (eastbound)
 Rest Areas: Charamerie (westbound), Leu (eastbound)
 Service Area: Brou
 04 (Brou) to 74 km: served cities Brou and Nogent-le-Rotrou
 Rest Areas: Les Charms (westbound), La Petite Jardinière (eastbound)
 Rest Areas: Théligny (westbound), Montmirail (eastbound)
 05 (La Ferté-Bernard) to 102 km: served cities La Ferté-Bernard
Service Areas: La Ferté-Bernard (westbound), Villaines-la-Ganais (eastbound)
 Rest Areas: Parnouette (westbound), La Charpenterie (eastbound)
 Rest Areas: Haras de Maulepaire (westbound), Martinière (eastbound)
 A28 - A11
 Service Area: La Sarthe-Sargé-Le-Mans
 07 (Le Mans) to 144 km: served city Le Mans
 A28-A11
 A81-A11 to 148 km
 08 (Le Mans-Center) to 150 km: served city Le Mans

Le Mans to Angers managed by ASF
 Rest Area: Pruillé-le-Chétif
 09 (Allonnes Le Mans-South) to 158 km: served cities Le Mans and Allonnes
 Rest Area: Pirmil
 Service Area: Parcé-sur-Sarthe
 10 (Sablé La Flèche) to 191 km: served cities Sablé-sur-Sarthe and La Flèche
 11 (Durtal) to 205 km: served city Durtal
 Rest Area: La Chapelle-Saint-Laud
 12 (Seiches-sur-le-Loir Baugé) to 218 km: served cities Seiches-sur-le-Loir and Baugé
 A85-A11 to 221 km
 Péage de Corzé
 Rest Area: Bauné
 13 (Pellouailles-les-Vignes) to 232 km: served city Pellouailles-les-Vignes
 Service Area: Angers Gateway
  A87-A11 to 238 km: Niort, Cholet, Poitiers

From Angers to Nantes managed by Cofiroute

 15: to 241 km served city Angers
 16: to 245 km served city Angers
 17: to 248 km served city Angers
 18 (Saint-Jean-de-Linières): to 254 km served city Saint-Jean-de-Linières
 Rest Areas: Montilets (westbound), Réveilllon (eastbound)
 19 (Chalonnes-sur-Loire): to 264 km served city Chalonnes-sur-Loire
 Service Area: Varades
 Péage d'Ancenis
 20 (Ancenis): to 294 km served city Ancenis
 Rest Areas: Le Cellier (westbound), Launay (eastbound)
 22: to 319 km City served Nantes
 A811-A11
 23: to 322 km served city Nantes
 24 (westbound only): to 324 km served city Nantes
 25: to 325 km served city Nantes
  to 328 km A844-A11

External links 
 A11 Motorway in Saratlas

Autoroutes in France
Chartres